Rear Admiral Anthony John Whetstone CB (12 June 1927 – 19 December 2022) was a British Royal Navy officer who served as Flag Officer Sea Training.

Naval career
Whetstone was born in Coventry on 12 June 1927. Educated at King Henry VIII School, Coventry, he joined the Royal Navy in 1945. He was given command of the submarine HMS Sea Scout in 1956, the submarine HMS Artful in 1959 and the submarine HMS Repulse in 1968. He went on to be commanding officer of the frigate HMS Juno in 1972, commanding officer of the destroyer HMS Norfolk in 1977 and Flag Officer Sea Training in 1980. He went on, in 1981, to be Assistant Chief of the Naval Staff (Operations), a role he undertook during the Falklands War, before retiring in 1983.
 
Whetstone was appointed a Companion of the Order of the Bath for services in the Falklands War in October 1982.

Personal life and death
Whetstone was predeceased by his wife, Betty. He died on 19 December 2022, at the age of 95.

References

1927 births
2022 deaths
Royal Navy rear admirals
Companions of the Order of the Bath
Royal Navy personnel of the Falklands War
People educated at King Henry VIII School, Coventry